Poyntzpass railway station (Irish: Pas Phoyntz or Pas an Phointe) serves Poyntzpass in County Armagh, Northern Ireland.

History 
The station was opened on 6 January 1862.  It was closed by the Ulster Transport Authority in 1965, and reopened in 1984 by Northern Ireland Railways.

Service 
As of Autumn 2022, there is a limited service from the station, with five trains towards  and four towards  on Mondays to Fridays; three trains towards Newry and two towards Bangor on Saturdays; and no services on Sundays.

References 

Railway stations in County Down
Railway stations opened in 1862
Railway stations served by NI Railways
Railway stations in County Armagh
1862 establishments in Ireland
Railway stations closed in 1965
Railway stations opened in 1984
Reopened railway stations in Northern Ireland
Railway stations opened by NI Railways
Railway stations in Northern Ireland opened in the 20th century
Railway stations in Northern Ireland opened in the 19th century